The 1929–30 UCLA Bruins men's ice hockey season was the 4th season of play for the program.

Season
After the turmoil of the previous season, the team was well served by just having some stability. While the coach and captain returned, most of the team was different than the previous season and that did not help the Bruins against their two opponents. They faced California and USC in two series during the year and, unfortunately, didn't win a single game. In most games the team's defense was good enough to keep the score close but, as it had been last year, the offense was lacking. Only towards the end of the year did UCLA look like a unified squad. While it was too late to salvage the 1930 season, since most of the players were to return for the following year there was some hope of improvement from the Bruins.

On a positive note, the ice hockey team was the only minor sport at UCLA that was able to not only pay for itself, but turn a profit for the year.

Jacobs served as team manager.

Note: UCLA used the same colors as UC-Berkley until 1949.

Roster

Standings

Schedule and Results

|-
!colspan=12 style=";" | Regular Season

References

UCLA Bruins men's ice hockey seasons
UCLA
UCLA
UCLA
UCLA